Lourdios-Ichère is a commune in the Pyrénées-Atlantiques department, southwestern France. The current mayor is Marthe Clot, elected in 2020.

History

The municipality was created in 1820 when Lourdios (a neighbourhood of Osse-en-Aspe) was united with Ichère (a neighbourhood of Sarrance).

In 2017 during the presidential election the town became known to the French public thanks to the candidate Jean Lassalle who had been the mayor for over 40 years. During the first round he won the majority of the vote with 68.8% in his constituency. At the national level, Lassalle is less popular, receiving 1.5% of votes countrywide.

See also
Communes of the Pyrénées-Atlantiques department

References

Communes of Pyrénées-Atlantiques
Pyrénées-Atlantiques communes articles needing translation from French Wikipedia